Sphenotitan is an extinct genus of basal opisthodontian sphenodontian reptile known from the Late Triassic Quebrada del Barro Formation of northwestern Argentina. It was first described and named by Ricardo N. Martínez, Cecilia Apaldetti, Carina E. Colombi, Angel Praderio, Eliana Fernandez, Paula Santi Malnis, Gustavo A. Correa, Diego Abelin and Oscar Alcober in 2013 and the type species is Sphenotitan leyesi. With an estimated skull length of 100mm, it is relatively large for rhynchocephalians.

At the time of its discovery, Sphenotitan was the earliest known opisthodontian, predating the previous oldest record, Opisthias, by 50 Ma.

Lifestyle
Based upon the dentition seen in the fossil specimens, this animal is believed to be herbivorous.

References 

Triassic lepidosaurs
Late Triassic reptiles of South America
Triassic Argentina
Fossils of Argentina
Fossil taxa described in 2013